Legare or Légaré may refer to:

People

 George Swinton Legaré (1869–1913), American politician
 Hugh S. Legaré (1797–1843), American lawyer and politician
 Sylvain Légaré (b. 1970), Canadian politician

Other uses

 USCGC Legare (WMEC-912), United States Coast Guard endurance cutter